Assyriska Fotbollsföreningen, also known simply as Assyriska FF, is a Swedish football club based in Södertälje, Stockholm County. The club, formed in 1974 by Assyrian immigrants, has advanced through the league system and is currently playing in the fourth highest Swedish league, Division 2. They played in the highest Swedish football league Allsvenskan in 2005 where their games were broadcast in over 80 countries. The club has also played a final in Svenska Cupen, which was lost against IF Elfsborg in 2003.

Assyriska is often viewed as a substitute national team by the Assyrian people.

The club has a fan base from all over the world and has also their own pop song which is called "My Assyrian team – the team of my dream". A documentary film about Assyriska called "Assyriska: A National Team Without A Nation" was also made in 2006 by Nuri Kino and Erik Sandberg. The success of the documentary film made it possible to win the Golden Palm Award at the Beverly Hills Film Festival.

History

Assyriska Föreningen in Södertälje was founded in 1971 by ethnic Assyrian refugees from Turkey who belonged to the Syriac Orthodox Church. Three years later, a football team was started and played its first season in the lowest league in 1975. They advanced through the divisions and reached the second highest league, Division 1 (today replaced by Superettan), in 1992, as the first immigrant team ever. The team was however relegated in 1993, and the next few years, the club played every second year in Division 1 before managing to stay there for more than one season in 1997.

In 2003 Assyriska made it to the final in Svenska Cupen, where they lost with 0–2 against IF Elfsborg. On the way to the final, they won against IFK Göteborg with 4–1 and Djurgårdens IF with 0–4.

They lost a promotion play-off against Örebro SK in 1999, but five years later, in 2004, Assyriska was promoted to Allsvenskan, the highest league, for the first time as Örebro SK was relegated due to economical problems. Assyriska's debut in Allsvenskan went well in the beginning and they had a couple of notable wins against big clubs as IFK Göteborg with 0–3 and against IF Elfsborg with 1–3. However Assyriska were relegated after only one season in the Allsvenskan, where they finished last. Since then Assyriska had fallen into Division 1 North, but enjoyed a strong season in 2007 to finish champions and were promoted back into the Superettan.

At the close of the 2009 season Assyriska, having held off the challenge of rivals Syrianska FC to finish third in the Superettan table, faced Djurgårdens IF in a play-off for a place in the Allsvenskan in 2010. Assyriska won the first match at home 2–0 but were overcome 3–0 after extra time in the repeat. In season 2010, Assyriska finished 4th in the Superettan. But 2010 was a season in which football became irrelevant for Assyriska after the murder of player Eddie Moussa.

Since then, the team has made a series of mid-table finishes and remains in the Superettan for the 2013 season.

Stadium

Assyriska Föreningen's primary stadium since 2006 is Södertälje Fotbollsarena. Until 2006, the team played at the old stadium Bårsta IP.

Supporters

Assyriska Föreningen's official fan club is called Zelge Fans. They were first started 1993 by a group of Assyriska supporters in Södertälje. They were known as Neshre, which means eagle (or eagles) in Syriac. Three months after they launched, the club changed its name to Zelge Fans, Zelge meaning "sun rays" in Syriac. The sun rays are a symbol of the Assyrian flag, which is where the idea to name the fan club Zelge Fans came from. Most of the members are Assyrians, but the Zelge fan club also has many Swedish members.

Assyriska's fans are also growing in numbers as a result of the internet. During its early years, Assyriska did not have the mass means of communication to be able to spread their team information consistently to other mass Assyrian areas (Chicago, New Jersey, California, Toronto, Sydney, etc.). With the tech age, Assyriska has been able to spread its fan base outside of Södertälje and become known in over 80 countries. Acting as their national team, Assyriska represents the entire population of Assyrians throughout the world.

Assyriska has become a true symbol for Assyrians traveling to Sweden. Many make it their goal to watch an Assyriska match at least once when they travel to Sweden.

Players

First-team squad

Retired numbers
18 – Eddie Moussa, forward (2001–2010)

Notable players
  Mikael Ishak

Staff

Sports
 Head Coach: Carlos Banda
 Assistant Coach: Elias Merkes
 Assistant Coach: Alexander Bernhard

Achievements

League
 Division 1 Norra:
 Winners (1): 2007
 Runners-up (1): 1999

Cups
 Svenska Cupen:
 Runners-up (1): 2003

Notable coaches
  Peter Antoine (1999)
  Bo Petersson (2002)
  Conny Karlsson (2003–2004, 2009)
  José Morais (2005)
  Rikard Norling (2010–2011)

Season to season

See also
Syrianska FC
List of Assyrian-Syriac football teams in Sweden

References

External links
 Assyriska Föreningen – Official Team Site
 Zelge Fans – Official Supporter Club Site
 SvenskaFans Assyriska – Supporter Site

 
Football clubs in Stockholm
Allsvenskan clubs
Sport in Södertälje
Assyrian football clubs
Assyrian/Syriac football clubs in Sweden
Association football clubs established in 1971
Association football clubs established in 1974
1974 establishments in Sweden
Diaspora sports clubs
Diaspora football clubs in Sweden